Mount Dergach is a flat-topped, ice-covered mountain located just west of Ob' Bay and south of Lunik Point, in the Bowers Mountains, a major mountain range of Victoria Land, Antarctica. The topographical feature was photographed from the air by U.S. Navy Operation Highjump, 1946–47. Surveyed by the Soviet Antarctic Expedition in 1958 it was named after meteorologist A.P. Dergach, a member of the Soviet Antarctic Expedition, 1959–61, who perished in a fire at Mirnyy Station on August 3, 1960. The mountain lies situated on the Pennell Coast, a portion of Antarctica lying between Cape Williams and Cape Adare.

References

Mountains of Victoria Land
Pennell Coast